This is a list of properties and districts in Montgomery County, Georgia that are listed on the National Register of Historic Places (NRHP).

Current listings

|}

References

Montgomery
Buildings and structures in Montgomery County, Georgia